31 Leonis is a binary star system in the equatorial constellation of Leo. The system is visible to the naked eye in unresolved form, having a combined apparent visual magnitude of 4.39. An estimated distance of around 160 light years is obtained from the annual parallax shift of 20.44 mas as seen from Earth's orbit. It is moving away from the Sun with a radial velocity of +39.8 km/s.

It has expanded to 30 times the Solar radius and is radiating around 227 times the Sun's luminosity from its photosphere at an effective temperature of 4,074 K. The magnitude 13.6 secondary, component B, lies at an angular separation of 7.9 arcseconds, as of 2008.

References

K-type giants
Binary stars
Leo (constellation)
Leonis, 31
Leonis, A
Durchmusterung objects
087837
049637
3980